Munshiganj-1 is a constituency represented in the Jatiya Sangsad (National Parliament) of Bangladesh since 2019 by Mahi B. Chowdhury of the Bikalpa Dhara Bangladesh.

Boundaries 
The constituency encompasses Sirajdikhan and Sreenagar upazilas.

History 
The constituency was created in 1984 from a Dhaka constituency when the former Dhaka District was split into six districts: Manikganj, Munshiganj, Dhaka, Gazipur, Narsingdi, and Narayanganj.

Ahead of the 2008 general election, the Election Commission redrew constituency boundaries to reflect population changes revealed by the 2001 Bangladesh census. The 2008 redistricting reduced the number of seats in the district from four to three, making each of the surviving three larger.

Members of Parliament 
Key

Elections

Elections in the 2010s

Elections in the 2000s 

Mahi B. Chowdhury resigned from parliament on 10 March 2004 to form new political party Bikalpa Dhara Bangladesh with his father, A. Q. M. Badruddoza Chowdhury. Mahi's resignation triggered a June 2004 by-election, which Mahi won as a Bikalpa Dhara Bangladesh candidate, defeating his nearest rival, BNP candidate Momin Ali, by a greater than two-to-one margin.

In November 2001, A. Q. M. Badruddoza Chowdhury became President of Bangladesh, vacating his parliamentary seat. Mahi B. Chowdhury, his son, stood as a BNP candidate in the resulting 2002 by-election, and was elected.

Elections in the 1990s

References

External links
 

Parliamentary constituencies in Bangladesh
Munshiganj District